John Stradling may refer to:
 Sir John Stradling, 1st Baronet, English poet, scholar and politician
 John Stradling (priest), Archdeacon of Llandaff

See also
 Sir John Stradling Thomas, Welsh politician